EU4 can refer to the following:
 Europa Universalis IV: a computer game by Paradox Interactive.
 Haplogroup E1b1b (Y-DNA) in human genetics, previously known as EU4.
 Big Four (Western Europe), four major European powers, also known as EU4.